The following article presents a summary of the 2011–12 football season in Croatia, which was the 21st season of competitive football in the country.

National teams

Croatia

Croatia U21

Croatia U20

Croatia U19

Croatia U17

League tables

Prva HNL

Druga HNL

Croatian clubs in Europe

Summary

Dinamo Zagreb

Hajduk Split

RNK Split

Varaždin

References